Maria Terrone (May 21, Manhattan) is an American poet and writer. She is the author of three collections of poetry: Eye to Eye (2014), A Secret Room in Fall (2006) and The Bodies We Were Loaned (2002). She has been nominated four times for a Pushcart Prize and has received the Individual Artist Initiative Award from the Queens Council on the Arts. Her poetry ranges widely in subject, including themes of history, family and contemporary urban environments.

Life and career
Terrone grew up in Jackson Heights, Queens, New York, and graduated from Fordham University with a Bachelor of Arts in English. In the early years of her career, she worked as a journalist, magazine editor and in corporate communications. In 1990, she joined the City University of New York: first at Hunter College as director of public relations and, in 2003, after moving to Queens College, as Assistant Vice President for Communications. She lives in Jackson Heights with her husband, William Terrone.

Terrone's poetry has been published in many prestigious literary magazines and anthologies, such as Poetry, The Hudson Review, Ploughshares, Barrow Street, Poetry International, Notre Dame Review, Crab Orchard Review, Alfred A. Knopf Everyman's Library, Beacon Press, CavanKerry Press and The Feminist Press.

Due to her association with Queens as an author and resident, she was selected to write a narrative for The Guggenheim Museum's Transhistoria, the third edition of stillspotting nyc, a two-year multidisciplinary project that takes the Guggenheim’s Architecture and Urban Studies programming out into the streets of the city’s five boroughs.

Works

Books of poetry

Poetry chapbook

International publications
Belgium (French): Three poems in L'Arbre a paroles magazine, a themed issue titled Les deux Sicilies
Iran (Farsi): Featured writer - Q&A interview and translated poems in Hengam, an independent literary supplement in a widely circulating daily newspaper.

Poems
"Ferdinandea," The Common.
"Ghost Frescoes," Poetry.
"After You've Saved the Bird," Verse Daily.
"House of Juliet" and "Y2K Apocalypse," Web Del Sol Review.
"Unmentionable," "The Passage (excerpt)," "The Glass Factory," The Clarion.

Anthologies
 "Faith" in 
 "Beets" in 
"His Cassandra" in 
 "The Slain Wife of the Lighthouse Keeper Speaks" in 
"Rereading the History Book: Centuries XX and XXI" in 
 "Firewalking Through Autumn" in 
 "Rapunzel Redux" in 
10-page section titled, "What They’ll Say in a Thousand Years," consisting of a short essay and 11 poems: "Two Women Waiting," "Strawberries," "Ceres Explains the Soul of Pasta," "Uncorking the Aged Wine," "Rosemary," "Salt for Uncle Charlie," "White," "At the Knife Skills Workshop," "Beets," "Blood Oranges," and "What They’ll Say in a Thousand Years," in

Non-fiction
"A Facebook Page in Iran," Kestrel.
"A Pilgrimage to 5 Pointz,"photo essay, The Common.
"At Home in the New World: a Jackson Heights Native Savors Her Neighborhood," a performed narrative commissioned by The Guggenheim Museum for stillspotting nyc: Queens.
"Desire in New Mumbai," Dispatches blog, The Common.
"Searching for Fergus," The Briar Cliff  Review.
"Feeding Your Creative Spirit," Her Circle Ezine.

Reviews
Rain Taxi's review of American Gothic, Take 2.
Italian Americana's review of A Secret Room in Fall and American Gothic, Take 2.
Montserrat Review's of A Secret Room in Fall.
Notre Dame Review's review of A Secret Room in Fall.
Daniela Gioseffi named Terrone "the best new writer" in PEN American Center, A Secret Room in Fall.
Fordham Magazine's review of The Bodies We Were Loaned.
ItalianAmericanWriters.com's review of The Bodies We Were Loaned.

Awards and honors
The Robert McGovern Publication Prize, Ashland University, Ashland Poetry Press, for A Secret Room in Fall (2006).
Elinor Benedict Prize in Poetry, Passages North
Allen Tate Memorial Award, Wind Magazine.
Willow Review Award in Poetry
Individual Artist Initiative Award, Queens Council on the Arts
Arts and Culture Award, Italian American Labor Council

References

External links
Maria Terrone's Website.
Terrone's Bio on Poetry Foundation's website.
Pirene’s Fountain, Featured Poet.
Interview with Maria Terrone, Magna Grece Journal.
Audio: Maria Terrone reads “In Hiding,” Quiddity International Literary Journal and Public Radio Program.
Mediterranean Poetry, Featured Poet.
Spotlight on Poet Maria Terrone,” Library Matters, Queens Library.
“Poet Turns to Queens for Inspiration,” Queens Tribune.
List of Italian American women writers.

Living people
21st-century American poets
American poets of Italian descent
Writers from Queens, New York
American women poets
21st-century American women writers
Year of birth missing (living people)